Sir Leslie Alfred Charles Fry  (17 April 1908 – 21 October 1976) was a British diplomat, who served as Ambassador to Hungary, Indonesia and Brazil. He was awarded Grand Cross of the Order of the Southern Cross by the Government of Brazil. When the Soviet Union invaded Hungary in 1956 to repress the Hungarian Revolution, he opened the doors of the British embassy to Hungarian refugees, receiving a knighthood the following year.

Life
Leslie "Bunny" Fry was born in 1908 in Monmouthshire, Wales and christened in Jammu and Kashmir.

Fry's parents were Florence Rose Fry (née Stokes, 1882–1918) and Alfred Andrew Fry MBE (1870–1919). Leslie Fry's father was a Freemason who prior to World War I had served in the South Wales Borderers as a Lieutenant and Quartermaster, Monmouthshire Regiment, 3rd Battalion, and during World War I as both a captain in the British Army, Monmouthshire Regiment, 3rd Battalion (Territorial) and a lieutenant in the Royal Air Force, 12th Wing.

Fry attended the Royal Masonic School and later graduated from the Royal Military Academy Sandhurst.

Fry's first wife was Mary Cuerden, from whom he separated and remarried.  Mary Cuerden's second husband was Captain Basil Gerritsen Ivory, formerly of the Special Operations Executive and director of the investment trust British Assets Trust Limited.  Fry's second wife was Marian Bentley, whom he married in 1954.

British Army career
Fry joined the British Army in India from 1928. On 2 February 1928, he was promoted to Second Lieutenant, Indian Army. In 1933, he transferred to the Indian Political Service. Between 1941 and 1944, he served as Undersecretary of the Government of India in the Ministry of Foreign Affairs. In 1946, he became Deputy Secretary of the Government of India in the Ministry of Foreign Affairs.

Diplomatic career

On 23 June 1947, Fry joined His Majesty's Foreign Service at the Seventh Grade listed alongside his cousin, Robert Morton Saner OBE. On 30 October 1947, Fry transferred from the Indian Civil Service to the Foreign Office. From 1951 to 1953, he served as Minister-Counsellor in Lisbon. Between 1953 to 1955, he was Head of the Foreign Office's Eastern Department.

On 24 October 1955, he was appointed Her Majesty's Envoy Extraordinary and Minister Plenipotentiary to Hungary. On 11 February 1959, he was ambassador to Indonesia. On 16 June 1963, he replaced Geoffrey Wallinger as ambassador to Brazil. 

Fry retired in 1966 and returned to Britain.

Awards and honours
 1 January 1944 awarded MBE when serving in the Indian Political Service as "Under Secretary to the Government of India in the External Affairs Department"
 14 August 1947 awarded OBE when "Deputy Secretary to the Government of India in the External Affairs and Commonwealth Relations Department"
 9 June 1955 awarded CMG
 13 June 1957 awarded KCMG

Bibliography 
Fry's memoirs, published in 1978:

References 

1908 births
1976 deaths
British diplomats
20th-century British diplomats
People educated at the Royal Masonic School for Boys
Knights Commander of the Order of St Michael and St George
Members of the Order of the British Empire
Companions of the Order of St Michael and St George
Officers of the Order of the British Empire
Indian Political Service officers
Graduates of the Royal Military College, Sandhurst
British Indian Army officers